General Thomas Ashburnham CB (1808 – 2 March 1872) was Commander of British Troops in China and Hong Kong.

Military career
Born the son of the 3rd Earl of Ashburnham, Thomas Ashburnham became a Coldstream Guards officer. He went on to serve in India during the First Anglo-Sikh War between 1845 and 1846.

He was appointed Commander of British Troops in China and Hong Kong in 1857.

He was also Colonel of the 82nd Regiment of Foot from 1859 until his death.

In retirement he lived in Park Street in London and died in 1872.

Family
In 1860, he married Adelaide Georgiana Frederica Foley, daughter of Thomas Foley, 3rd Baron Foley.

References

1808 births
1872 deaths
British Army generals
Companions of the Order of the Bath
Coldstream Guards officers
British military personnel of the First Anglo-Sikh War
Younger sons of earls